HKHS may refer to:

 Henry Kendall High School, a co-educational comprehensive secondary day school in Gosford, New South Wales, Australia
 Hong Kong Housing Society, the second largest public housing provider in Hong Kong